The Academy of Lund or Studium generale was the first university in the Nordic countries. It was founded together with the Grey Friars' monastery in the 1400s, when Lund was under Danish rule. In existence for more than a century, the academy was suppressed in 1537 when the Reformation reached Denmark.  The present-day Lund University is a separate institution, founded in 1666, though the inspiration for the new university was based on the memory of the old one. Throughout the period, Lund also had a renowned Latin School (The Cathedral School) that Bishop Peder Winstrup and others saw as a good basis for a new university - that was one of the main motivations for basing the new university at Lund and not Kristianstad or Malmö.

References

Defunct educational institutions in Sweden
Lund
Universities in Sweden